Carex subscabrella is a tussock-forming perennial in the family Cyperaceae. It is native to parts of the Dominican Republic.

See also
 List of Carex species

References

subscabrella
Plants described in 1929
Taxa named by Georg Kükenthal
Flora of the Dominican Republic